The won sign , is a currency symbol. It represents the South Korean won, the North Korean won and,  unofficially, the old Korean won.

Appearance 
Its appearance is "W" (the first letter of "Won") with a horizontal strike going through the center. Some fonts display the won sign with two horizontal lines, and others with only one horizontal line. Both forms are used when handwritten.

Encoding  
The Unicode code point is : this is valid for either appearance.

Microsoft Windows
In Microsoft Windows code page 949, the position  (backslash) is also used for the won sign.

In Korean versions of Windows, many fonts (including system fonts) display the backslash character as the won sign. This also applies to the directory separator character (for example) and the escape character(₩n). Most Korean keyboards input  when the won sign key is pressed, so the Unicode letters are rarely used.

The same issue (of dual use of a code point) occurs with the yen sign in Japanese versions of Windows.

MacOS
In macOS, the won sign key inputs  only when in Hangul input mode.

Fictional use 
In fiction, it is used for the woolong, a fictional currency in anime by Shinichirō Watanabe (Cowboy Bebop, Space Dandy and Carole & Tuesday), and for "Kinzcash", the currency of the online game Webkinz.

References

See also
 Pound sign#Double dash style

Currency symbols